Bożena Teresa Borys-Szopa (born 11 March 1954) is a Polish trade union activist and politician. She was the chief labour inspector (2006–2008), minister in the Chancellery of the President (2009–2010), and minister of family, labour and social policy (2009).

While working for President Lech Kaczyński, Borys-Szopa focused on social dialogue and labor law. She was part of the regional legislature in the Silesian Voivodeship, and is now in her second term as an MP.

References

Law and Justice politicians
21st-century Polish politicians
Living people
1954 births
Government ministers of Poland
Women government ministers of Poland
21st-century Polish women politicians
People from Bieruń-Lędziny County